Hana Shur (also Romanized as Ḩanā Shūr; also known as Hina Shūr, Hīneh Shūr, Hinshoor, and Honīshūr) is a village in Tasuj Rural District, Shonbeh and Tasuj District, Dashti County, Bushehr Province, Iran. At the 2006 census, its population was 216, in 49 families.

References 

Populated places in Dashti County